KeyBank Center is a multipurpose indoor arena located in Buffalo, New York. Originally known as Marine Midland Arena, the venue has since been named HSBC Arena and First Niagara Center. Home to the Buffalo Sabres of the National Hockey League since 1996, is the largest indoor arena in Western New York, seating 19,070. It replaced the Sabres' former home, Buffalo Memorial Auditorium, where the team played from 1970 to 1996. The venue is also home to the Buffalo Bandits of the National Lacrosse League.

KeyBank Center was previously home to the Canisius Golden Griffins (NCAA), Buffalo Blizzard (NPSL), Buffalo Wings (RHI) and Buffalo Destroyers (AFL).
 
In addition to concerts and professional wrestling, the venue has hosted major events including the NCAA Division I men's basketball tournament, 1999 Stanley Cup Finals, 2003 Frozen Four and UFC 210.

History

Planning and construction
What was originally known during construction as Crossroads Arena opened September 21, 1996, replacing the Buffalo Memorial Auditorium. The construction cost was $127.5 million, (approximately $ in  dollars).

The venue was named after its central downtown location, which was originally proposed as the site of a domed stadium in the 1960s for the Buffalo Bills and a potential Major League Baseball team before that project was abandoned.

Opening and reception
On November 16, 1996, the arena's first JumboTron, an eight-sided scoreboard made by Daktronics with Sony video screens, fell to the ice while it was being remotely moved. This happened minutes after a few players ended practice and hours before a game between the Buffalo Sabres and Boston Bruins. Nobody was injured, but the game was postponed. The scoreboard was replaced later that season.

Alterations

The first update to the arena took place after the conclusion of the 1998-1999 hockey season. 95 seats were added behind the last row of the 300 level, raising the arena's hockey and lacrosse capacity from 18,595 to 18,690.

The second update to the arena took place in 2002–2003, when the Sabres replaced matrix board on the face of the second bowl with a LED ribbon. The original seamless glass boards were also removed, and replaced with boards with clear plastic stanchions, which gave when players were hit into them.

The third update to the arena took place prior to the 2007–2008 season. Two illuminated Sabres logos were added in the upper level of the pavilion on both sides of the Sports Headlines bar. Also, new LED ribbon boards were installed in the arena seating bowl in conjunction with the new HD scoreboard manufactured by Daktronics. In addition, the four main speaker racks were removed and replaced and two additional speaker racks were added. The new scoreboard features four large HD video screens, surrounded by two 360-degree LED ribbon boards. The bottom of the board features large Buffalo Sabres logos with giant sabres crossed behind them. The handles of the sabres are lit with blue LEDs. The Sabres logos shoot smoke out of the Buffalo's nostrils every time a Sabres goal is scored or when the Sabres win at home. Later in 2008, a mural was installed in the lower pavilion near the main entrance, containing pictures from the 2008 NHL Winter Classic held at Ralph Wilson Stadium, now known as Highmark Stadium, in nearby Orchard Park.

The fourth update took place during the summer and early fall of 2011. The major renovation included the demolition and installation of brand new locker rooms, decor and concession updates as well as fan enhancements. The new Sabres locker room is designed as a circular room, complete with illuminated team logos on the floor and ceiling. Additional new facilities include a state of the art fitness center, new coaching offices, film rooms where players and coaches can watch previous games, and a players lounge with a kitchen and team chef. Also, the new Sabres locker room features a Wall of Fame featuring team history, the names and numbers of retired team jerseys. Limestones that were salvaged from the former Buffalo Memorial Auditorium are surrounded by glass, which features the names of all team players throughout franchise existence. Finally, a new post-game interview room was also built. In addition to the new locker rooms and training facilities, the public spaces within the arena were also upgraded.

Also as part of the update, the arena took on the Sabres Blue and Gold color scheme inside the arena bowl. It replaced the red color used on the team logo from 1996 to 2006. The previous Sabres logo (known infamously as the "Buffaslug", and used from 2006 to 2010) was removed from the scoreboard and replaced with the current logo. All of the original TV sets were replaced with new HDTVs. New food choices were added as part of the upgraded concessions. Signage was replaced or upgraded where needed. Restrooms saw cup holders and HDTVs added for fan convenience. Also, new chimes were added, which sound two minutes prior to the opening faceoff each period.  This lets fans know to head towards the seating areas. Finally, the Sports Headlines bar has now been replaced by the Labatt Blue Zone.

The ice rink itself also saw a multimillion-dollar upgrade with adding a new dehumidifier system and cooling tower. All of the Zamboni machines were replaced and upgraded to feature laser beam leveling. These upgrades improve the quality of the ice surface. Outside, a new LED ribbon board was added to the entrance pavilion which can display upcoming events, scores, and team information, though it was subsequently removed to make way for the construction of a new pedestrian bridge to the adjacent LECOM Harborcenter complex in 2014.

The fifth update features the creation of the Tops Markets Alumni Plaza. In July 2012, the space located between the arena's entrance pavilion and the parking ramp saw the concrete bridge columns covered with brick. All of the team members that the Buffalo Sabres have had throughout existence are now featured on plaques that are mounted to the bricks. In addition, fans of the Sabres are able to purchase custom plaques that will be featured alongside the team members. Alumni Plaza's centerpiece is a 10' high bronze statue of The French Connection. These renovations were completed in October 2012.

The sixth update included multiple changes, including modifying the entrance pavilion due to the LECOM Harborcenter construction.  That building is attached to the arena by an elevated walkway. LECOM Harborcenter is a mid-rise building with 2 hockey rinks, a Marriott hotel, retail space, IMPACT Training facility, restaurants including 716 Food and Sport and flagship Tim Hortons and a parking garage. Construction began in early 2013, while the restaurants and rinks opened in late October 2014. The elevated walkway connecting the KeyBank Center and LECOM Harborcenter buildings was completed and opened in early 2015, while the Marriott hotel opened in the summer of 2015. Also, after the 2011-12 Buffalo Sabres season, the Sabres added 380 seats, mainly as an additional row in the 200 level, to raise the arena's capacity to 19,070. This number is symbolic of the team's founding in 1970. In 2013, the Buffalo Sabres announced that all 80 luxury suites would be renovated over a 3-year period. All suites will now feature the Sabres Blue and Gold color scheme, 50" TVs, new carpeting, new furniture and gathering islands. Construction began on this project in July 2013.

The seventh update took place during the summer of 2016 on the exterior due to the renaming from First Niagara Center to KeyBank Center. The entrance canopies that featured hockey images were replaced. New exterior signage was installed during the week of August 11, 2016 and KeyBank debuted the rebranded arena on September 19, 2016.  Also, a new LED lighting system was installed by Ephesus.  This allows the arena to provide better lighting while significantly reducing the number of light fixtures needed and reducing energy consumption.

Naming rights

Naming rights were sold to Marine Midland Bank, part of the HSBC banking group in 1996, and the building was renamed Marine Midland Arena before the first game had been played. The bank bought the naming rights for 30 years then to expire in 2026. 

In 1999, as part of HSBC's worldwide corporate rebranding, the arena's name was changed to HSBC Arena, with the official renaming taking place on March 17, 2000. This name change coincided with the playing of the first college basketball tournament game in the arena's history. 

In 2011, Buffalo-based First Niagara Financial Group reached an agreement to purchase HSBC Bank's upstate New York and Connecticut branch network, including much of the core of the old Marine Midland. While naming rights to HSBC Arena were not included in the sale, First Niagara, HSBC, the Buffalo Sabres and other parties reached an agreement to establish a new naming rights deal with First Niagara. The name of the arena became First Niagara Center that summer, with the official renaming taking place that fall. First Niagara bought the naming rights for 15 years, approximately the remainder of the time that was left on HSBC's naming rights deal with the arena.

KeyCorp announced its plans to purchase First Niagara—and thus also the naming rights to the arena—on October 30, 2015. Although exterior signage was installed during the week of August 11, 2016, the renamed KeyBank Center became official on September 19, 2016.

On September 10, 2019, Pegula Sports and Entertainment reached a 10-year naming rights agreement for the building connected to KeyBank Center with Lake Erie College of Osteopathic Medicine (LECOM). LECOM Harborcenter was developed by Pegula Sports and Entertainment and occupies a full  city block formerly known as the Webster Block, directly across from and connected to the KeyBank Center and Canalside.

Notable events

Hockey

The venue hosted its first Buffalo Sabres regular season home game on October 8, 1996.

The arena hosted the 1998 NHL Entry Draft and the 2016 NHL Entry Draft.

The arena hosted games three, four, and six of the 1999 Stanley Cup Finals. 

In 2003, the arena hosted the Frozen Four NCAA Ice Hockey tournament. 

The arena was host to a house party for the 2008 NHL Winter Classic. Festivities included the Buffalo Sabres Alumni Hockey Team playing in pre-game action, followed by the Winter Classic shown on the scoreboard. 

From December 2010 to January 2011, the arena hosted the IIHF World Junior Championship tournament. 

During the 2012 NHL lockout, the arena hosted several Rochester Americans games and continues to host occasional Americans games at the arena. 

In October 2014, the arena hosted its first Ontario Hockey League contest, a neutral-site game between the Erie Otters (who counted among its players marquee prospect Connor McDavid) and the Niagara IceDogs.

Basketball

The NBA carried over their annual preseason contest from Buffalo Memorial Auditorium with annual Toronto Raptors preseason games at the new venue.

Canisius College played select home games at the arena from 1996 to 1998, moving there after decades at the Aud. However, they moved all games on campus to the Koessler Center after the 1997–98 season.

The arena has been home to the NCAA (2000, 2004, 2007, 2010, 2014, 2017, 2022) and MAAC (1997, 1999, 2001, 2005) men's basketball tournaments.

The arena was the centerpiece of a longshot bid to bring the National Basketball Association back to Buffalo by luring the Vancouver Grizzlies; the Grizzlies instead relocated to Memphis, Tennessee in 2001.

Professional wrestling

KeyBank Center has hosted professional wrestling events from WCW, WWE, and AEW. This included TV tapings of Monday Nitro, Raw is War, SmackDown, ECW, Superstars, Main Event, NXT, Dynamite, and Rampage. WCW produced the annual Ilio DiPaolo Memorial Show at the venue between 1997 and 1999.

In addition, the venue hosted several pay-per-view events including Fully Loaded (1999), Fall Brawl (2000), The Great American Bash (2005), Armageddon (2008), Night of Champions (2011) and Battleground (2013).

Other sports
On April 8, 2017, KeyBank Center hosted UFC 210: Cormier vs. Johnson 2, which was the first UFC event held in Buffalo for over 20 years.

Concerts

Performances from Barenaked Ladies' October 9, 1998 concert at the venue are featured in their 1999 documentary Barenaked in America.

Avril Lavigne's May 18, 2003 concert at the venue was released as Avril Lavigne: My World.

On June 21, 2011, Taylor Swift performed at the arena during her "Speak Now World Tour" to a sold-out crowd of 14,487. 

In March 2015, the arena hosted country music legend Garth Brooks for a 4-night, 6 show, sold out string of shows, bringing over 100,000 people to Downtown Buffalo. He also had his wife, Trisha Yearwood, along for the shows. 

Coldplay performed at the arena on August 1, 2016 to a sold out crowd of 15,100 as part of their A Head Full of Dreams Tour. 

A live recording of Bruce Springsteen and the E Street Band's performance at the arena in 2009 titled HSBC Arena, Buffalo, NY, 11/22/09 was released on December 24, 2016.

Special features

Tributes

The press box in the arena is named after former Sabres broadcaster and Hockey Hall of Fame member Ted Darling.

References

External links

 

1996 establishments in New York (state)
Basketball venues in New York (state)
Buffalo Bandits arenas
Buildings and structures in Buffalo, New York
Canisius Golden Griffins men's basketball
College basketball venues in the United States
College ice hockey venues in the United States
HSBC
Indoor ice hockey venues in New York (state)
Indoor lacrosse venues in the United States
Indoor soccer venues in New York (state)
Mixed martial arts venues in New York (state)
National Hockey League venues
Pegula Sports and Entertainment
Sports venues completed in 1996
Sports venues in Buffalo, New York
Tourist attractions in Buffalo, New York
Buffalo Sabres